Orthaga basalis is a species of snout moth in the genus Orthaga. It was described by Frederic Moore in 1888 and is known from India (including Darjiling).

References

Moths described in 1888
Epipaschiinae
Endemic fauna of India